Randulf is a masculine given name which may refer to:

 Pandulf Ironhead (died 981), also spelled Randulf, Prince of Benevento and Capua, Duke of Spoleto and Camerino and Prince of Salerno
 Ranulf (chancellor) (died 1123), also spelled Randulf, English cleric and Lord Chancellor for King Henry I
 Randulf of Evesham, (fl. 13th century), medieval Bishop of Worcester elect and Abbot of Evesham
 Randulf Dalland, (1900–1984), Norwegian politician
 Randulf Hansen (1858–1942), Norwegian ship designer

Masculine given names